The history of the Jews in the territory of modern Saudi Arabia begins in Biblical times, at least as early as the First Temple period. 

Some have estimated that there are about 3,000 Jews currently residing in the country.

Early history
The first mention of Jews in the areas of modern-day Saudi Arabia dates back, by some accounts, to the time of the First Temple. Immigration to the Arabian Peninsula began in earnest in the 2nd century CE, and by the 6th and 7th centuries there was a considerable Jewish population in Hejaz, mostly in and around Medina. This was in part due to the embrace of Judaism by such leaders as Dhu Nuwas; who was very aggressive about converting his subjects to Judaism. Nuwas persecuted Christians in his kingdom as a reaction to the Christian persecution of Jews by the local Christians and Abu Karib Asad. In 523, the Himyarite king Dhu Nuwas (Dunaan), who had converted to Judaism, massacred the Christians there.

According to Al-Masudi the northern part of Hejaz was a dependency of the Kingdom of Judah, and according to Butrus al-Bustani the Jews in Hejaz established a sovereign state. The German orientalist Ferdinand Wüstenfeld believed that the Jews established a state in northern Hejaz.

Tribes of Medina

There were three main Jewish tribes in Medina before the rise of Islam in Arabia: the Banu Nadir, the Banu Qainuqa, and the Banu Qurayza. Banu Nadir was hostile to Muhammad's new religion. Other Jewish tribes lived relatively peacefully under Muslim rule. Banu Nadir, the Banu Qainuqa, and the Banu Qurayza lived in northern Arabia, at the oasis of Yathrib until the 7th century, when the men were executed and the women and children were enslaved after they betrayed the pact they made with the Muslims following the Invasion of Banu Qurayza by Muslim armies led by Muhammad.

Other Arabian Jewish tribes
 Banu Alfageer
 Banu Awf
 Banu Harith or Bnei Chorath
 Banu Jusham
 Banu Quda'a 
 Banu Shutayba

The journey of Benjamin of Tudela

A historical journey to visit far-flung Jewish communities was undertaken by Rabbi Benjamin of Tudela from 1165 to 1173 that crossed and tracked some of the areas that are located in present-day Saudi Arabia. One map of his travels shows that he stopped at Jewish communities living in Tayma and Khaybar two places that are known to have a longer significant historic Jewish presence in them, the Battle of Khaybar was fought between Muhammad and his followers against the centuries-long established Jewish community of Khaybar in 629. Tudela's trek began as a pilgrimage to the Holy Land. He may have hoped to settle there, but there is controversy about the reasons for his travels. It has been suggested he may have had a commercial motive as well as a religious one. On the other hand, he may have intended to catalogue the Jewish communities on the route to the Holy Land so as to provide a guide to where hospitality may have been found for Jews travelling to the Holy Land. He took the "long road" stopping frequently, meeting people, visiting places, describing occupations and giving a demographic count of Jews in every town and country.

One of the known towns that Benjamin of Tudela reported as having a Jewish community was "El Katif" located in the area of the modern-day city of Hofuf in the northern part of the Arabian Peninsula. Al-Hofuf also Hofuf or Al-Hufuf is the major urban center in the huge al-Ahsa Oasis in Eastern Province, Saudi Arabia. The city has a population of 287,841 (2004 census) and is part of a larger populated oasis area of towns and villages of around 600,000. It is located inland, southwest of Abqaiq and the Dhahran-Dammam-Al-Khobar metropolitan area on the road south to Haradh.

Najran community

There was a small Jewish community, mostly members of Bnei Chorath, in one border city from 1934 until 1950. The city of Najran was liberated by Saudi forces in 1934 after it been conquered by Yemenis in 1933, thus absorbing its Jewish community, which dates to pre-Islamic times. With increased persecution, the Jews of Najran made plans to evacuate. The local governor at the time, Amir Turki ben Mahdi, allowed the 600 Najrani Jews a single day on which to either evacuate or never leave again. Saudi soldiers accompanied them to the Yemeni border.  These Jews arrived in Saada, and some 200 continued south to Aden between September and October 1949. The Saudi King Abdulaziz demanded their return, but the Yemeni king, Ahmad bin Yahya refused, because these refugees were Yemenite Jews. After settling in the Hashid Camp (also called Mahane Geula) they were airlifted to Israel as part of the larger Operation Magic Carpet.

Some groups of Najran Jews escaped to Cochin, as they had very good relationship with the rulers of Cochin and maintained trade connections with Paradesi Jews.

According to Yemenite Jewish tradition, the Jews of Najran traced their origin to the Ten Tribes.

Modern era
There has been virtually no Jewish activity in Saudi Arabia since the beginning of the 21st century. Jewish (as well as Christian and other non-Muslim) religious services are prohibited from being held in Saudi Arabia.  When American military personnel were stationed in Saudi Arabia during the Gulf War, permission for small Christian worship services was eventually granted, but Jewish services were only permitted on US warships.  Census data does not identify any Jews as residing within Saudi Arabian territory.

Historically, persons with an Israeli stamp in their passport or who are openly religious (and not Islamic) were generally not permitted to enter the Kingdom. In the 1970s, foreigners wishing to work in the kingdom had to sign an affidavit stating that they were not Jewish and official government forms granting foreigners permission to enter or exit the country do ask for religious affiliation.

During the Gulf War, there were allegations that some United States military authorities were encouraging Jewish military personnel to avoid listing their religions on their ID tags. (It has been reported that Jewish personnel, along with others, were encouraged to "use discretion" when practicing their religion while deployed to Saudi Arabia).  American servicemen and women who were Jewish were allowed into the kingdom, but religious services had to be held discreetly on base. It has been affirmed that alternative "Protestant B" dog tags were created, in the event that a Jewish serviceman or woman was taken prisoner in Iraq. The story was included in one civilian writer's anthology of military stories she had been told by others, and then that one story was reprinted or quoted in many other in-print or online locations including Hadassah Magazine). It has been the subject of much debate as to its veracity, with some military personnel stating that the story is "absolutely false."

In late December 2014, the newspaper Al-Watan reported that the Saudi Labor ministry website permits foreign workers of a variety of different faiths, including Judaism, to live and work in Saudi Arabia. A source within the ministry said, in effect, that Israelis were not allowed to enter Saudi Arabia, but Jews of other nationalities would not have the entry ban applied to them. In practice Christians and Jews may hold religious services but only in their homes and may not invite Muslims. However, as of May 2022, Israeli media outlets reported that dozens of Israelis were able to enter Saudi Arabia with Israeli passports using special visas. According to some Jewish expatriates living in the Kingdom, there are around 3,000 Jews who currently reside in Saudi Arabia, mostly from the US, Canada, France, and South Africa.

Since 2019, Rabbi Yaakov Yisrael Herzog, an American-born Israeli agribusiness entrepreneur, has been visiting Saudi Arabia to establish connections with its Muslim religious leaders, and visiting Jewish tourists, business representatives, and American military personnel, with the goal of organizing a Jewish community.

After the Abraham Accords, Saudi Arabia outlawed the disparagement of Jews and Christians in mosques, and also removed anti-semitic passages from school textbooks.

See also
 
 Israel–Saudi Arabia relations
 History of the Jews in the Arabian Peninsula
Saudi Arabia textbook controversy
 Arab Jews
 Babylonian captivity
 History of the Jews under Muslim rule
 Jewish exodus from Arab lands
 Judaism and Islam
 List of Jews from the Arab World
 Mizrahi Jews

Notes

References
 Stillman, Norman. Jews of Arab Lands, Jewish Publications Society, 1979.
 New Standard Jewish Encyclopedia, 1992, Encyclopedia Publishing, "Aden", "Arabia", "Hadramaut"

History and travels of Benjamin of Tudela
 Benjamin of Tudela. The Itinerary of Benjamin of Tudela: Travels in the Middle Ages. trans. Joseph Simon. Pangloss Press, 1993. 
 The Itinerary of Benjamin of Tudela. trans. Marcus Nathan Adler. 1907: includes map of route (p. 2) and commentary.
 
 Shatzmiller, Joseph. "Jews, Pilgrimage, and the Christian Cult of Saints: Benjamin of Tudela and His Contemporaries." After Rome's Fall: Narrators and Sources of Early Medieval History. University of Toronto Press: Toronto, 1998.
 Jewish Virtual Library: Benjamin of Tudela.

 
Saudi Arabia